Francis Haly (1783–1855) was the Roman Catholic Bishop in Kildare and Leighlin from 1838 until his death in 1855. 
He was born in Doonane, in Co. Laois and entered Maynooth College in 1807 to train as a priest. Initially he served as a curate in Rathvilly in Co. Carlow. He succeeded Bishop Edward Nolan to the see of Kildare and Leighlin in 1838.

He died on 19 August 1855 and is buried in Carlow Cathedral.

References 

1783 births
1855 deaths
19th-century Roman Catholic bishops in Ireland
People from County Laois
Alumni of St Patrick's College, Maynooth
Roman Catholic bishops of Kildare and Leighlin